Shalom Bible Seminary is a Christian Theological College located in Sechü Zubza in the Kohima District of Nagaland, India. It is part of the Angami Baptist Church Council (ABCC) and is a community-sponsored institute in Nagaland.

History 
Shalom Bible Seminary was first founded in 1946 by Rev. J. E. Tanquist as a Bible School to teach and train the natives for the local churches but the Bible school did not survive due to political and financial problems and was shut down. After many years it was established in 1996 by Angami Baptist Church Council to provide quality pastoral training.

Present day 
Shalom Seminary is well recognized Seminary worldwide and admits International students also. Rev Dr Sanyü Iralu is the Principal of the Seminary.

Affiliations 
The Seminary is recognized by Nagaland Baptist Church Council, Council of Baptist Churches in Northeast India and Directorate of Higher Education, Nagaland. It is accredited by Asia Theological Association and is a Partner Institute of Overseas Council International, USA.

See also 
 Christian Seminaries and Theological Colleges in India

References

Bible colleges
Christian seminaries and theological colleges in India
Universities and colleges in Nagaland
Kohima
Educational institutions established in 1996
1996 establishments in Nagaland